Hudsonimyia is a genus of non-biting midges in the subfamily Tanypodinae of the bloodworm family Chironomidae.

Species
H. karelena Roback, 1979
H. parrishi Caldwell & Soponis, 1982

References

Tanypodinae